Glyptopetalum palawanense is a tree in the family Celastraceae. The specific epithet  refers to the species being native to the island of Palawan in the Philippines.

Description
Its twigs are coloured grey-green.

Distribution and habitat
Glyptopetalum palawanense grows naturally in Palawan and in neighbouring Sabah in Borneo. Its habitat is coastal ridges.

References

palawanense
Trees of the Philippines
Flora of Palawan
Trees of Borneo
Flora of Sabah
Plants described in 1925
Taxonomy articles created by Polbot
Taxa named by Elmer Drew Merrill